Daisy Rasammah Daniels, known popularly as Rukmani Devi  (15 January 1923 – 28 October 1978) was a Sri Lankan film actress and singer, who was often acclaimed as "The Nightingale of Sri Lanka". She made it to the silver screen via the stage and had acted in close to 100 films, at the time of her death. Having an equal passion for singing as well as a melodious voice, she was Sri Lanka's foremost female singer in the gramophone era. After her death, she was awarded the Sarasaviya 'Rana Thisara'- Life Time Achievement Award at the 1979 Sarasaviya Awards Festival.

Personal life
Rukmani Devi, was born as Daisy Rasammah Daniels to a Tamil Colombo Chetty Christian family on 15 January 1923 at Ramboda in Nuwara Eliya, Sri Lanka. Second, in a family of five, her father, John Daniel worked on a plantation and her mother, Helen Rose was a teacher. She grew up in Colombo and had her early education at St. Matthew's School and then moved on to St. Clare's School, Wellawatte.

She was married to veteran dramatist, actor and singer, Eddie Jayamanne, whom she fell in love with as a result of her close association with him, when performing in dramas produced by "Minerva Dramatic Club" founded by B. A. W. Jayamanne. They lived at "Jaya Ruk", at Angurukaramulla, Negombo.

Career

As a little girl, Daniels showed an inborn talent to sing and dance. At the age of seven, she was picked to sing Christmas carols. Impressed with her ability to sing, dance, and also to act, she was selected to perform a main role in a Christmas play, 'The Shoemaker's Wife'. The stage play was trained and presented by St. Clare's School, Wellawatte. Watching her play this role much enthusiastically, Walter Abeysinghe, a drama producer sought permission from her father, to invite her to play the lead role of 'Sita' in his drama 'Ramayanaya.' Thus, in 1935 at the age of just 12 years she performed in this stage play, presented by the 'Sinhala Natya Sabha'.

This marked the beginning of an illustrious career that would span over four decades. As her performances were highly appreciated by the packed audience, well-known dramatist Dick Dias chose her for two of his stage plays, "Jana Kiharanaya" and "Mayawathie". She was now flooded with stage dramas, as she became Mayawathi in Charles Dias' 'Mayawathi', Juliet in a Sinhala adaption of Romeo and Juliet, playing the lead female role in all of them. Rukmani performed her singing career as a simple singer on Sri Lankan radio in the mid-1940s.

Gabriel Gunaratne, who was in charge of recording songs at the then His Master's Voice (HMV) Gramophone Records Company, was the permanent music director of the company. She was introduced to the H. W. Rupasinghe one day in October 1938 by Gunaratne. Rupasinghe, who saw Rukmani's singing prowess, chose her for the first album, which was launched by Master His Voice No. 9300. With her first audio recording of the famous song "Siri Buddhagaya Vihare" with Master  in 1938 at the age of 15, she captured the hearts of the masses and she shaped her career from that of an actress to that of an actress turned singer. This song was recorded to 78 rpm (gramophone) record label HMV with the number N-9300 and issued in 1939 by the Cargills Ltd, local agents for HMV.

Her unique voice attracted many music directors, as her singing career moved from the stage to the silver screen. Joining Rupasinghe Master's band as a regular singer, she faced three challenges at the time. That is, she had not studied Hindustani classical music properly as well as had to compete with renowned singers of that year such as Lakshmi Bai, Annie Boteju and Susila Jayasinghe. The third was the language challenge. She did not know how to read or write Sinhala and she used to write it all down in English. Due to the vocal training given by Rupasinghe Master through those songs, she soon became a simple classical singer as well as the most popular young singer on the His Masters Voice record company. During 1938–45, she recorded 44 songs for HMV Records. Rukmani sang almost all the Sinhala songs composed in Hindi and Vanga classical songs sung by Kumari Jutika Roy, then popularly known as "Bhajan Songstress" in India.

It was also, around this time that her name underwent a change from Daisy Daniels to the well known 'Rukmani Devi'. There are two schools of thinking as to how the name "Rukmani Devi" originated. According to one school, the late H. W. Rupasinghe maestro created the name, while the other believe that Jayantha Weerasekara and Michael Sannas Liyanage who is in his 90s, created it. Entering the stage, Rukmani had the opportunity to perform in Noorthi dramas such as Janakiharanaya, Rohini and Mayawathi. Since 1940, B. A. W. Jayamanne, founder of "Minerva Dramatic Club" of Negombo took Rukmani to perform remarkable roles in his dramas, such as 'Apparition', 'Broken Promise', 'Changing Fate, 'Defeated Aim', 'Evasive Denial', 'Fanatic Faith', 'Grisly Guardian', 'Hasty Decision' and lastly 'Irangani'. Above-mentioned plays followed the English alphabet.

The popular play 'Broken Promise' (Kadawunu Poronduwa), was adapted into a film by B. A. W. Jayamanne. This was the first Sinhala film – Kadawunu Poronduwa, screened on 21 January 1947. Rukmani Devi, who also began her film career through the role of 'Ranjani' in this film, also became the first local cinema actress. Her film career, which thus began spread over a period of more than three decades. According to Sri Lankeya Cinema Vanshaya (pp 637 – 638) written by Nuwan Nayanajith Kumara, from Kadawunu Poronduwa in 1947 to Ara Soyza in 1984, Rukmani Devi had played different roles in 99 films, up to the time of her death. Rukmani Devi won the first place in the "Popular Singing Series" in the 1953 Radio Artists Classification Test.

An equally talented singer, some of the immortal songs she sang for films are Sandyave Sriya for 'Kadawunu Poronduwa', Pinsara Mage Soyura for 'Kapati Arakshakaya', Gala Kandeni, and Moranawa Preme Hade for 'Weradun Kurumanama', Nindede Rathri Yahane for 'Peralena Iranama', Mavila Pena vi Rupe for 'Kela Handa', Pem Sihina Loke Maya for 'Mathabhedaya', Melavi Yanna Hada Mage for 'Daiva Yogaya', Suva dena Sita Sanasum for 'Ladalu' and Doi Doi Puta for 'Ahasin Polavata'. In 1975 Rukmani sing "Pem Rajatahane" with Milton Mallawarachchi. Rukmani made duets with amateur singers since the 1960s, such as: song "Ada Handapana Paya Hari Lassanai" with Sujatha Perera (Attanayake), "Gang Ivuru Paduru Gane" with Sidney Attygalle, "Kokilaya Keviliya", "Denna Piriye Dethata Oya Detha" with H. R. Jothipala, and "Ithin Palak Nehe Kumariya" with J. A. Milton Perera.

In the mid sixties she joined the Sinhala calypso musical group 'Los Cabelleros' led by late Neville Fernando. They recorded ever popular sinhala songs such as "Malbara Himidiriye", "Menike Obe Sinawe" & "Sandak Nage". Rukmani Devi was also featured prominently on the airwaves of Radio Ceylon, the oldest radio station in South Asia.

Death
Rukmani Devi, died in a tragic motor accident near St. Mary's Church, Thudella on 28 October 1978. She was returning after a musical show in Uyanwatte, Matara. Her funeral ceremony was attended by a very large gathering; film makers and dramatists, friends, politicians, relatives and her beloved fans.

She was the most celebrated Sri Lankan artiste and a statue in memory of her was erected at the Kanuwana Junction. The road on which the Rukmani Devi Museum in Negombo is located was also renamed 'Rukmani Devi Mawatha' by President Ranasinghe Premadasa, on 28 October 1990.

Awards
Best background Singer for the song 'Doi doiya putha' in the film 'Ahasin Polawata' at the inaugural Presidential Awards Ceremony in 1976.
Best actress Award for 'Kele Handa' at the 'Deepasika' awards ceremony conducted by 'Lankadipa' Newspaper in 1956.
Voted Best Actress with a majority of 16,221 votes at the 'Reader's Contest' conducted by 'Dinamina' Newspaper in 1955.

In popular culture
She was the one and only Sri Lankan actress on the cover page of popular Indian Film Magazine "Filmfare" and was also featured in "My like and dislike" in 1958 in the Filmfare. The second generation Toyota HiAce is known in Sri Lanka as the 'Rukmani Model', because she was travelling in one when she had her fatal accident.

Attack on Grave Site
On 12 August 2011, a former mayor of Negombo and a former Minister of the Parliament Mr. Ananda Munasinghe was allegedly charged and arrested by the Negombo Police for dislodging the statue of Rukmani Devi, erected on her grave by one of her fans Mrs. Sriyani Achala Dissanayake. Several popular media bloated this incident as an attack by an unidentified group of criminals to Rukmani Devi's grave, and a protest rally to this incident was organised in Negombo on 14 August 2011.

Songs
 Ada Handanawa Himiyani Yasodara
 Adara Nadiya Gala
 Adara Pana Suda
 Adaraya Nisa Harde Bandena
 Adarayai Karunawayi
 Alokaya Hama Thana Pathire
 Anna Sudo Ara Pata Wala - (with Mohideen Beg)
 Ara Ramani Pem Handa Akase - (with Dharmadasa Walpola)
 Ase Geethe Madura Jeewe - (with Dharmadasa Walpola)
 Asure Nisa Me
 Chandra Mage Ko Ane
 Dadi Kala Matha
 Dalwaw Bathi Adara Pem
 Danno Budunge
 Deerghayu Siri Labewa - (With H. W. Rupasinghe & Kokila Devi)
 Denna Priye Dathata Oya Datha
 Deviyan Ko Saman Deviyan
 Dewa Gini Mawa
 Dharmaraja Maraji - (With H. W. Rupasinghe)
 Doi Doiya Putha
 Dushmantha Aho Kimado
 Gala Kandeni
 Giye Aida Mawa Thanikara
 Hada Gilei Ama Mihire - (with Mohideen Baig)
 Herdhey Pina-aei
 Jaya Mangala Gatha
 Jeewithe Ma
 Kiyanna Rankanda
 Koheda Yanne Ran Menike Oya
 Lakmenige Darukela - (with H. W. Rupasinghe & Kokila Devi)
 Mage Prema Raja 
 Manike Obe Sinahawe - (with Neville Fernando)
 Mata Mata Gamini Mata - (with H. W. Rupasinghe)
 Mawa Penwala
 Muhude Pathule Kimidee - (with Mohideen Baig)
 Muniraja Diyana Swami - (With H. W. Rupasinghe)
 Muni Sri Dalada - (With master H.W.Rupasinghe)
 Nilambare Paya - (With master H.W.Rupasinghe)
 Pem Rajadhane Ahas Maligavo - (with Milton Mallawarachchi)
 Pem Rajaya
 Pem Sagare
 Raja Sri Mangala - (With H. W. Rupasinghe)
 Sandyawe Pena Pena - (with H. W. Rupasinghe)
 Saranawewa Wasana - (With H. W. Rupasinghe & Kokila Devi)
 Siri Buddhagaya Vihare - (With H. W. Rupasinghe)
 Siri Pada Kamal - (With H. W. Rupasinghe)
 Silpa Satara Loke - (With H. W. Rupasinghe)
 Srimuni Gautama - (With H. W. Rupasinghe)
 Siriyavi Mage - (With Mabel Blyth)
 Sudata Sudey - (With Mohideen Baig)
 Thayam Mayam
 Thribhuwana Jana Puja - (With H. W. Rupasinghe)
 Wandimee Sadaren - (with H. W. Rupasinghe & Kokila Devi)
 Wasanawantha Kala Laba - (with Dharmadasa Walpola)

Filmography

References

External links
  Rukmani Devi's official website 
 Rukmani Devi's Biography in Sinhala Cinema Database
 National Film Corporation of Sri Lanka – Official Website
 A rare interview with the Radio Ceylon
   Rukmani Devi in Sinhala
 රුක්මණී ගැන ඇත්ත කතාවක්
 Evaluating Rukmani's role in films

1923 births
1978 deaths
People from Central Province, Sri Lanka
Road incident deaths in Sri Lanka
Sri Lankan Chetty actresses
Sri Lankan Chetty musicians
Sri Lankan Roman Catholics
20th-century Sri Lankan women singers
Sri Lankan film actresses
20th-century Sri Lankan actresses